Sandra Coppard (born ) is a Rhodesian Paralympic swimmer, and table tennis athlete. She competed at the 1968 Summer Paralympics, winning gold medals in Women's 25 metre Freestyle, and Women's 25 metre Breaststroke. She won a bronze medal in Women's single table tennis, and finished fourth in Women's 25 metre Backstroke.

References 

Paralympic gold medalists for Rhodesia
Paralympic swimmers of Rhodesia
Possibly living people
Year of birth missing